The Robert Award for Best Sound Design is one of the merit awards presented by the Danish Film Academy at the annual Robert Awards ceremony. The award has been handed out since 1984.

Honorees

1980s 
 1984: Jan Juhler for 
 1985: Morten Degnbol for The Element of Crime
 1986: Niels Arild Nielsen and Niels Bokkenheuser for 
 1987:  for 
 1988: Niels Arild Nielsen and Lars Lund for Pelle the Conqueror
 1989: Niels Arild Nielsen for

1990s 
 1990: Niels Arild Nielsen for 
 1991: Niels Arild Nielsen for War of the Birds
 1992: Per Streit Jensen for Europa
 1993: Niels Arild Nielsen for Pain of Love
 1994: Niels Arild Nielsen for The House of the Spirits
 1995: Per Streit Jensen for Riget
 1996: Hans Møller for 
 1997: Per Streit Jensen for Breaking the Waves
 1998: Morten Degnbol and Stig Sparre-Ulrich for Eye of the Eagle
 1999: Per Streit Jensen for Heart of Light

2000s 
 2000: Niels Arild Nielsen for 
 2001: Per Streit Jensen for Dancer in the Dark
 2002: Nino Jacobsen for Shake It All About
 2003: Michael Dela & Nino Jacobsen for I Am Dina
 2004: Morten Green for Reconstruction
 2005: Nalle Hansen for Terkel in Trouble
 2006: Hans Møller for Nordkraft
 2007: Hans Møller for Prag
 2008: Hans Christian Kock and Claus Lynge for Island of Lost Souls
 2009: Hans Møller for Flame & Citron

2010s 
 2010: Kristian Eidnes Andersen for Antichrist
 2011: Morten Green for R
 2012: Kristian Eidnes Andersen for Melancholia
 2013: Morten Green for A Hijacking
 2014: Kristian Eidnes Andersen for Only God Forgives
 2015: Kristian Eidnes Andersen for Nymphomaniac Director's Cut

References

External links 
  

1984 establishments in Denmark
Awards established in 1984
Film sound awards
Sound Design